Robert Gordon Lee Fairweather,  (March 27, 1923 – December 24, 2008) was a lawyer and Canadian politician.

Fairweather was born in Rothesay, New Brunswick, the son of J.H.A.L. Fairweather and Agnes C. McKeen. Fairweather was educated at Rothesay Collegiate. He served in the Royal Canadian Naval Volunteer Reserve during World War II from 1941 to 1945, retiring with the rank of lieutenant commander. He then obtained a Bachelor of Civil Law degree from the University of New Brunswick in 1949 and went on to earn his doctorate at Osgoode Hall. He was called to the bar in 1949 and entered the practice of law in Saint John. In 1958, he was named Queen's Counsel.

In 1946, he married Nancy Elizabeth Broughall. They had two sons, Michael and Hugh, and a daughter, Wendy.

From 1952 to 1962, he represented King's County in the Legislative Assembly of New Brunswick and from 1958 to 1960 he was the Attorney General.

In 1962, he was elected to the House of Commons of Canada as a Progressive Conservative candidate for the New Brunswick riding of Royal. He was re-elected in 1963, 1965, 1968, 1972, and 1974.

From 1977 to 1987, he was appointed the first chief commissioner of the Canadian Human Rights Commission. From 1989 to 1992, he was founding chairman of the Immigration and Refugee Board of Canada.

He was an official observer of elections in Zimbabwe, El Salvador, Guatemala, and Malaysia and headed the Canadian delegation at the U.N. Commission on Human Rights in Geneva on three occasions. He received honorary doctoral degrees from several universities, the Outstanding Achievement Award of the Public Service in 1990, the 1997 Tarnopolsky Award for fostering human rights, the 1999 Canadian Red Cross (New Brunswick Branch) Humanitarian of the Year Award, and the 2002 New Brunswick Pioneer of Human Rights Award.

In 1978, he was made an Officer of the Order of Canada "for notable services to his country". In 2005, he was awarded the Order of New Brunswick.

His cousin Elsie Wayne was also a member of the House of Commons and served as acting leader of the federal Progressive Conservative Party during 1998.

A well-known Red Tory, he fought for abortion rights and bilingualism and against capital punishment. In June 1977 an amendment put forward by Gordon Fairweather to add sexual orientation to the Canadian Human Rights Act was defeated in committee: only Fairweather and Stuart Leggatt (NDP, who had introduced a similar amendment) voted in favour. When the Canadian Charter of Rights and Freedoms was being drafted, he urged addition to the Charter of protections based on physical handicap, marital status, and sexual orientation.

In the 2004 election campaign, after the merger of the PC Party with the Canadian Alliance, he admitted he was struggling with the new party's social conservatism. "I'm a Red Tory and I'm anxious to see that the party is broadly based. The centre is where anyone who expects to form a government should be," said Fairweather. "I don't like seeing issues that have been long settled by the Supreme Court or the Constitution or time, being hauled out of the barn."

Fairweather died on December 24, 2008, at the age of 85.

Archives 
There is a Gordon Fairweather fonds at Library and Archives Canada.

Electoral history

References
Canadian Parliamentary Guide, 1963, PG Normandin

External links
 
 Entry at Rothesay Living Museum by Gordon Fairweather

1923 births
2008 deaths
Progressive Conservative Party of Canada MPs
Members of the House of Commons of Canada from New Brunswick
Progressive Conservative Party of New Brunswick MLAs
Members of the Executive Council of New Brunswick
Officers of the Order of Canada
Members of the Order of New Brunswick
Lawyers in New Brunswick
Canadian King's Counsel
Canadian military personnel of World War II
University of New Brunswick alumni
York University alumni
Immigration and Refugee Board of Canada
University of New Brunswick Faculty of Law alumni
Osgoode Hall Law School alumni